Tchamba Prefecture is one of the prefectures of Togo located in the Centrale Region.

The center is at Tchamba. The cantons (or subdivisions) of Tchamba include Tchamba, Koussountou, Adjéidè (Kri-Kri), Kaboli, Balanka, Alibi, Affem, Larini, Bago, and Goubi.

See also
Tchamba

References 

Centrale Region, Togo
Prefectures of Togo